China Zorrilla (born Concepción Matilde Zorrilla de San Martín Muñoz; 14 March 1922 – 17 September 2014) was an Uruguayan theater, film, and television actress, also director, producer and writer. An immensely popular star in the Rioplatense area, she is often regarded as a "Grand Dame" of the South American theater stage.

After a long career in the Uruguayan theater, Zorrilla made over fifty appearances in Argentina's film, theater and TV. Her career took off in Uruguay in the 1950 and 1960s, later she settled in Argentina, where she lived for over 35 years and was popular on TV, theater, and cinema. At 90, she retired and returned to Uruguay, where she died in 2014.

In 2008, Zorrilla was invested Chevalier des Arts et des Lettres by the French Government and in 2011, the Correo Uruguayo (the national postal service in Uruguay) released a print run of 500 commemorative postage stamps dedicated to her.

Early life
Born in Montevideo into an aristocratic Uruguayan family, "China" was the second of the five daughters of Guma Muñoz del Campo and sculptor José Luis Zorrilla de San Martín (1891–1975), a disciple of Antoine Bourdelle, responsible for monuments in Uruguay and Argentina. Revered as Uruguay's national poet, her paternal grandfather was Juan Zorrilla de San Martín, author of Tabaré. An artistic family, her older sister, Guma Zorrilla (1919–2001), was a theater costume designer for the Uruguayan stage.

She grew up in Paris with her four sisters. Back in Montevideo, she attended Sagrado Corazón (Holy Cross) School. In 1946, she earned a British Council scholarship to the Royal Academy of Dramatic Art in London, where she studied under Greek actress Katina Paxinou.

Uruguay 
Back in her hometown, Zorrilla made her theater debut in Paul Claudel's The Tidings Brought to Mary in 1948. Immediately after, she joined the ensemble of the National Comedy of Uruguay working for 10 years at the Solís Theatre, where Spanish actress Margarita Xirgu directed her in García Lorca's Blood Wedding, Fernando de Rojas' La Celestina, Shakespeare's A Midsummer Night's Dream, Romeo and Juliet, and other classics

During the 1950s and 1960s, Zorrilla appeared in Bertolt Brecht' Mother Courage and Her Children, "Filomena Marturano", Romeo and Juliet, Macbeth, A Midsummer Night's Dream, Tartuffe. The Seagull, Wilder's Our Town, Neil Simon's Plaza Suite, Giraudoux's The Madwoman of Chaillot, and plays by Pirandello, Peter Ustinov, Tirso de Molina, Lope de Vega, Henrik Ibsen, August Strindberg, J.B. Priestley, and Ferenc Molnár. She received critical acclaim for her performances in Thornton Wilder's The Matchmaker and in Hay Fever as Judith Bliss.

After a decade at the Comedia Nacional, Zorrilla went on to found the Teatro de la Ciudad de Montevideo with actor Enrique Guarnero and actor-writer Antonio Larreta. The company toured Buenos Aires, Paris, and Madrid, where they won the Spanish Critics Award for their stagings of Federico García Lorca's La zapatera prodigiosa and Lope de Vega in the summer of 1961.

Between 1964 and 1966, Zorrilla took a sabbatical year and lived in New York, where she worked as a French teacher and Broadway secretary. In New York, she staged Canciones para mirar, a children's musical based on texts by Argentine poet Maria Elena Walsh. During her stay in the U.S., Zorrilla was rumoured to have an affair with comedian Danny Kaye, who often mentioned her in interviews.

As a correspondent for the Uruguayan newspaper El País, she covered events such as the Cannes Film Festival for Homero Alsina Thevenet and other international events (later published in a book Diarios de viaje) and also hosted a talk show for many years.

In opera, she directed Puccini's La bohème, Verdi's Un ballo in maschera at the Solís Theatre and the Montevideo's SODRE and Rossini's Il barbiere di Siviglia at the Teatro Argentino de La Plata in 1977.

2011 – The voice of the narrations of OTRA VIDA by the English composer Clive Nolan and the writer Elizeth Schluk

Argentina

Stage

Summoned by actor and director Lautaro Murúa to appear as Donna Natividad in the third movie version of Un Guapo del 900, China Zorrilla's film debut came late in 1971 at age 49. The following summer she made replaced actress Ana María Campoy in Butterflies are Free, which was performed in Mar del Plata. She settled in Buenos Aires. Her stay coincided with the civilian-military dictatorship in Uruguay (1973–1985), which forced her to stay abroad. Zorrilla expressed her solidarity by protecting and helping Uruguayans flee the dictatorship. During that period, she was banned by the military regime from performing in Uruguayan theatres. After the country's return to democracy in the 1980s, Zorrilla made a triumphal comeback at the Teatro Solís as Emily Dickinson.

During the mid-1970s and 1980s, Zorrilla toured and performed nationally and internationally, including the Kennedy Center for the Performing Arts.

On stage she has portrayed historical figures such as Emily Dickinson in William Luce's The Belle of Amherst, Monica Ottino's Victoria Ocampo, Mrs. Patrick Campbell in Jerome Kilty's Dear Liar: A Comedy of Letters. Zorrilla performed in plays by Jean Cocteau, Lucille Fletcher, Oscar Viale, and fellow countryman Jacobo Langsner who wrote several plays for her. She reprised one of her theater earlier successes, the part of Judith Bliss in Hay Fever.

In 1995, she appeared in Buenos Aires's main opera house, the Teatro Colón as Persephone in Stravinsky and Gide's Perséphone.

Zorrilla adapted, directed, and produced plays and musicals: Goldoni's Servant of Two Masters, Reginald Rose's 12 Angry Men, Georges Feydeau's A Flea in Her Ear and Neil Simon's Lost in Yonkers.

In the last decade, she won four awards as sculptor Helen Martins in Athol Fugard's The Road to Mecca and as Eve in an adaption of Mark Twain's Eve's Diary.

Film and TV
After her debut in 1971 as Mother Natividad in Murua's Un guapo del 900, Zorrilla appeared in more than 40 Argentinian movies. In 1973, she became a popular star in Alberto Migré's soap operas. In 1984, she won Best Actress at the La Habana Film Festival for "Darse Cuenta". She performed in Summer of the Colt (a Canadian coproduction), Maria Luisa Bemberg's Nobody's Wife, The Jewish Gauchos, the coproduction The Plague (starring William Hurt and Raúl Juliá), Edgardo Cozarinsky's Guerriers et captives, Manuel Puig's "Pubis Angelical", Adolfo Aristarain's Lasts Days of the Victim, and in the Argentine black comedy Esperando la carroza (Waiting for the Hearse).

Later, Zorrilla earned international recognition for her performances in Conversaciones con mamá in 2005 (2004 Best Actress Award at the 26th Moscow International Film Festival and the Málaga Film Festival) and in Elsa & Fred, which won her several awards, including the Silver Condor for Best Actress.

Death 
Zorrilla died on 17 September 2014 from pneumonia in a hospital in Montevideo, Uruguay, aged 92. The government of Argentina and Uruguay declared two days of national mourning
defining her as "a true representative of River Plate culture". She was waked at Montevideo's Congress. Before reaching the cemetery, the procession made a brief stopover at the Teatro Solís.

Honors 
 Orden de Mayo by the Argentine government
 Orden Gabriela Mistral by the Chilean government
 Illustrious Citizen of Buenos Aires, Montevideo, and other Argentine cities, and two theaters bear her name
 Knight (Chevalier) of the Légion d'honneur by the French Government
 Honorary Medal, Domingo Faustino Sarmiento del Senado de la Nación Argentina 2010
 Commemorative Postage Stamp, Uruguayan Post

Books
 Diego Fischer, A mi me aplauden, 2012, Uruguay, 
 China Zorrilla, Diario de viaje, Ediciones La Plaza, 2013, Uruguay, 
 Julio Maria Sanguinetti (2015). "Retratos desde la memoria" Montevideo: Debolsillo. ISBN 9789974899179
 Miguel Ángel Campodónico, Nuevo Diccionario de la Cultura Uruguaya, Librería Linardi y Risso, 2003, S.361

Music

Otra Vida – Composed by Clive Nolan written by Elizeth Schluk, year 2011 Altagama Producciones.

Filmography

Film

Television

Bibliography

References

External links 

 
Obituary Buenos Aires Herald
 Diego Fischer, A mi me aplauden (Montevideo 2012), Biographical Essay 
Clive Nolan – Elizeth Schluk, Disco Otra Vida
https://www.tvshow.com.uy/personajes/fotogaleria-video-recordar-china-zorrilla-seis-anos-partida.html

1922 births
2014 deaths
Actresses from Montevideo
Chevaliers of the Légion d'honneur
Chevaliers of the Ordre des Arts et des Lettres
Illustrious Citizens of Buenos Aires
Uruguayan expatriate actresses in Argentina
Uruguayan film actresses
Uruguayan people of Spanish descent
Uruguayan stage actresses
20th-century Uruguayan actresses
21st-century Uruguayan actresses
Alumni of RADA
Uruguayan television actresses
Deaths from pneumonia in Uruguay
Burials at the Central Cemetery of Montevideo
Recipients of the Delmira Agustini Medal
Uruguayan diarists